The autobiography of comedian and social activist Dick Gregory, co-authored with Robert Lipsyte, nigger was originally published in September 1964 by E. P. Dutton, and has since 1965 been reprinted numerous times in an edition available through Pocket Books, altogether selling more than one million copies to date. The book has never been out of print since its publication. Gregory continued his life story in two subsequent books, Up From Nigger and Callus On My Soul. Gregory earned a $200,000 advance from the book.

Origins
It was written during the American Civil Rights Movement. Gregory comments on his choice of title in the book's primary dedication, addressing his late mother,

Table of contents
 Not Poor, Just Broke
 "...and they didn't even have what I wanted."
 One Less Door

The book contains photographs of Gregory performing at the Village Gate; he and his brother (1942); his mother, Lucille; Gregory as a drummer at Southern Illinois University (1953); as an SIU sprinter and Outstanding Athlete of the Year (1953); with coach Leland Lingle (1954); with Sammy Davis Jr. at Roberts Show Club, Chicago (1959); in a jail cell in Chicago; performing at the Hungry i, San Francisco (1963, shortly before the murder of Medgar Evers); at a voter registration rally, Greenwood, Mississippi (April 1963), among others.

Quotes
Addressing his maternal ancestors again,

Cover title
The original book cover stylizes the main title, "nigger", in all lower case, cursive writing. The title in its other appearances is otherwise formatted as most other books, either in all uppercase, or with normal book title capitalization.

Reception
The New York Times wrote, in its review,

The book has been the subject of critical commentary, particularly in reference to its use of the pejorative term as the title. It remains one of his best known works.

In 2016, the Dean of Matteo Ricci College at Seattle University was forced to resign after students protested her recommending the book to an African-American student. While the controversy was ongoing, Dick Gregory published an article supporting her against the protesters.

See also
 The Nigger Bible, a 1967 analysis of the word, with a preface by Gregory

References

Dick Gregory
1964 non-fiction books
African-American autobiographies
E. P. Dutton books
Pocket Books books
Collaborative autobiographies